Neron or Néron may refer to:

Neron (DC Comics), a fictional character in the DC Comics' universe.
 An alternative name of the Roman Emperor Nero
 André Néron, a mathematician, who introduced: 
 Néron minimal model
 Néron differential 
 Néron–Severi group 
 Néron–Ogg–Shafarevich criterion
 Néron–Tate height 
 Geneviève Néron, a Canadian actress and musician
 Néron, Eure-et-Loir, a commune in the Eure-et-Loir department of France
 Néron, a village in the commune of Amanlis in the Ille-et-Vilaine department of France, located in the region of Brittany
 NOAA's Environmental Real-time Observation Network (NERON), the US Weather Observation Network
 Néron (opera) by Anton Rubinstein

See also 
 Nero (disambiguation)
 Nerone (disambiguation)